Rosa Menga (born 7 August 1992) is an Italian doctor and politician. She was elected as a member of the Five Star Movement and sat in the Chamber of Deputies from 2018 until 2022.

Biography 
Menga was born in Foggia and trained as a doctor. In 2017, she was a contestant on the game show Chain Reaction, and won over 100,000 euros. She was elected to the Chamber of Deputies in the 2018 general election.

She was expelled from her party on 19 February 2021 for not voting in confidence in the Draghi Cabinet. In March 2022, she joined the Green Europe party. She did not run in the 2022 Italian general election.

See also 

 List of members of the Italian Chamber of Deputies, 2018–2022

References 

Living people
1992 births
Deputies of Legislature XVIII of Italy
21st-century Italian women politicians
Five Star Movement politicians
People from Apulia
Italian physicians
Politicians affected by a party expulsion process
Green Europe politicians
Women members of the Chamber of Deputies (Italy)